Prem Bandhan is a 1979 Indian Hindi-language romantic drama film directed by Ramanand Sagar. The film stars Rajesh Khanna, Rekha and Moushumi Chatterjee as the lead actors and is supported by A. K. Hangal, Prema Narayan, Bhagwan, Keshto Mukherjee and Lalita Pawar. The film's music is by Laxmikant Pyarelal. This film, along with Amar Deep, marked the comeback of Rajesh Khanna, as these were his commercially successful films after a period of one full year as in the year 1978, none of his films became huge hits at the box office, with the exception of Bhola Bhala. The news magazine "The Indian" noted that "Rajesh Khanna makes a sincere attempt to recover his popularity as "superstar" and succeeds. He gives naturally touching performance".

The story revolves around the adventures of Rajesh Khanna after he suffers from amnesia post accident and falls in love with and marries a fisher woman, whereas his sophisticated city-bred girlfriend waits for him in the city. The film has the popular song of the 1979 Main Tere Pyar Mein Pagal sung by Kishore Kumar and Lata Mangeshkar. Kishore Kumar delivers his best vocals in the song.

Plot summary
Adivasi Mahua lives a poor lifestyle in a fishing village along with her widowed father. One day, the local Poojary comes across a seemingly menacing looking male, feeds him, and asks Mahua's dad to look after him. This male has no memory and they name him Kishan. Shortly thereafter, Mahua and Kishan fall in love and get married. After about 2 months, Kishan goes to the city and does not return home. A frantic Mahua and her father go to the police as well as to the city to search for him, albeit in vain and return home. Mahua continues to worry about Kishan and sets out on her own to try to locate him. She meets with a doctor who informs her that he recalls treating a male fitting Kishan's description and gives her his Bombay address. Mahua travels to Bombay and locates Kishan's house. This is where she will find out that Kishan now calls himself Mohan Khanna, is wealthy, lives in a mansion but who now refuses to recognize her, and is about to become formally engaged to equally wealthy Meena Mehra.

Cast
Rajesh Khanna as Kishan/Mohan Khanna
Rekha as Mahua
Moushami Chatterji as Meena Mehra
Vikram as Dr. Vinod, Chanda's fiancée
Braham Bhardawaj as Senior doctor
Janki Dass as Rodrigues, Khanna Enterprises' accountant
Javed Khan as Eve teaser
Birbal as Bhelpuri vendor
Helen
Master Bhagwan
Keshto Mukherjee
Prema Narayan
A. K. Hangal
Lalita Pawar
Om Shivpuri
Chandru Atma
Arvind Trivedi as  Mahua's father
Rippy Singh as Chanda

Crew
Director – Ramanand Sagar
Producer – R. R. Nanda
Production Company – Gauri Films
Editor – Lachhmandass
Music Director – Laxmikant–Pyarelal
Lyricist – Anand Bakshi
Playback Singers – Asha Bhosle, Manna Dey, Mahendra Kapoor, Kishore Kumar, Lata Mangeshkar

Soundtrack

Reception
This film received three and a half stars in the Bollywood guide Collections. The film grossed 3,50,00,000 at the box office in 1979. It was a hit movie which ran silver jubilee at many centers

References

External links
 

1979 films
Indian romantic drama films
1970s Hindi-language films
1979 romantic drama films
Films scored by Laxmikant–Pyarelal
Films directed by Ramanand Sagar